The numismatic series Natural Resources of Peru ("Recursos naturales del Perú" in Spanish) is a series of coins minted by the Central Reserve Bank of Peru with the aim of both promoting a numismatic culture and highlighting the natural wealth of Peru.

All coins in the series have the denomination of 1 Nuevo Sol and are legal tender throughout the country. Ten million units of each of the following coins have been minted:

See also 
 Peruvian nuevo sol
 Numismatic series Wealth and Pride of Peru

References

External links 
 Numismatic Series "Natural Resources of Peru" in limaeasy.com

Coins of Peru